The Independent Party of Mozambique is a political party in Mozambique. 
At the last legislative elections, 1 and 2 December 2004, the party won 0.6% of the popular vote and no seats. Its presidential candidate, Yaqub Sibindy, won 0.9% of the popular vote.

Political parties in Mozambique